Milan Bubalo (born 8 May 1990) is a Serbian footballer who plays as a forward.

Career
Born in Inđija (SR Serbia, SFR Yugoslavia) he played with Inđija and Hajduk Kula in the Serbian SuperLiga before moving to Slovenian side Koper in summer 2012.

After playing for four years in Asia for Gyeongnam, Muangthong United, Pattaya United and BEC Tero Sasana, Bubalo returned to Serbian football, signing a two-year-deal with Vojvodina.

References

External links
 
 
 

1990 births
Living people
Serbian footballers
Serbia youth international footballers
Association football forwards
Serbian SuperLiga players
K League 1 players
Slovenian PrvaLiga players
Milan Bubalo
Milan Bubalo
FK Inđija players
FK Hajduk Kula players
FC Koper players
Gyeongnam FC players
FK Vojvodina players
Milan Bubalo
Milan Bubalo
Milan Bubalo
Milan Bubalo
Milan Bubalo
FK Novi Pazar players
FK Budućnost Dobanovci players
Milan Bubalo
Serbian expatriate footballers
Serbian expatriate sportspeople in Slovenia
Serbian expatriate sportspeople in South Korea
Serbian expatriate sportspeople in Thailand
Expatriate footballers in Slovenia
Expatriate footballers in South Korea
Expatriate footballers in Thailand
People from Inđija